The Chick-fil-A Kickoff Game is an annual series of college football games played on the opening weekend of the NCAA Division I FBS season in Atlanta, Georgia. Organized by the Peach Bowl, the event coincides with Labor Day weekend in the United States. From its inception in 2008 until 2016, it was held at the Georgia Dome. The Georgia Dome's replacement, Mercedes-Benz Stadium, began hosting the games starting in 2017. Since 2012, there have been occasional doubleheaders in the series.

History 

Organizers intended for the game to become a national spotlight game, on par with the Kickoff Classic held in the Meadowlands from 1983–2002, and the Disneyland Pigskin Classic in the 1990s. In 2008, ESPN's College Gameday broadcast from Downtown Atlanta, while ESPN corporate sponsors and local Atlanta-based companies featured prominent displays at Fanzones in Atlanta's Centennial Olympic Park.

Payout to each team depends on the amount of revenue gained in excess of the Kickoff's $5.5 million budget. In 2008, Clemson and Alabama were both expected to receive more than $2 million.

Series summary 
The first game, known that year as the Chick-fil-A College Kickoff, was played on August 30, 2008, the opening Saturday of the 2008 season. Alabama defeated Clemson 34–10.

Alabama returned to the Chick-fil-A Kickoff for the 2009 game, defeating Virginia Tech to begin the 2009 season.

Auburn and UCLA were initially slated to play in 2010, but Auburn officials later backed out of the offer. ABC attempted to replace Auburn with Georgia Tech, but the switch prompted UCLA to opt out entirely because the game would essentially be a home game for the Atlanta-based Yellow Jackets, with no scheduled return trip to Los Angeles. Finally, an agreement was reached in which LSU and North Carolina would match up, with the Tigers winning 30–24. The 2010 game also saw the introduction of a trophy awarded to the winner, the Old Leather Helmet.

The 2011 edition was the first Chick-fil-A Kickoff to feature a team that was not a member of the ACC or SEC, the two conferences with tie-ins to the Peach Bowl. Boise State of the Mountain West Conference, one of the most successful programs from a BCS non-automatic qualifier conference in recent years, defeated Georgia 35–21.

The Chick-fil-A Kickoff consisted of two games in 2012. Tennessee defeated NC State 35–21 on Friday night prior to Clemson defeating Auburn 26–19 in the headliner on Saturday. The dual-game idea was first mentioned in the Miami Herald in May 2010, when Gary Stokan, president of the Chick-Fil-A Bowl, told the newspaper that there was the possibility of having Alabama face Miami in a rematch of the 1993 Sugar Bowl.

The 2013 edition was a rematch of the 2009 game. Alabama, the two-time defending BCS national champions, once again defeated Virginia Tech, this time by a score of 35–10.

2014 would again feature two games. Ole Miss defeated Boise State 35–13 in a Thursday night game. Alabama would defeat West Virginia 33–23 in the headliner on Saturday afternoon. It marked the first ever meeting between Alabama and West Virginia in any sport. 

The 2015 Chick-fil-A Kickoff Game, which moved to CBS that season, returned to a single game with the ACC's Louisville Cardinals taking on the SEC's Auburn Tigers. Auburn defeated Louisville, 31–24.

The 2016 Chick-fil-A Kickoff Game, which moved back to ESPN, featured North Carolina and Georgia, both making their second appearances in the kickoff series. The Bulldogs defeated the Tar Heels 33–24 in the final edition of the game played the Georgia Dome.

The 2017 event was the third doubleheader in the series. Alabama defeated Florida State on Saturday evening by a score of 24–7, serving as the Saturday Night Football season opener.  Tennessee defeated Georgia Tech 42–41 in double overtime on Monday evening.  The two games were the first in the series to be played in the new Mercedes-Benz Stadium in Downtown Atlanta.

For the first time, the 2020 event was intended to include three games across two consecutive weeks, with a week 1 doubleheader between Florida State and West Virginia, followed by Georgia and Virginia. Auburn and North Carolina were to also play a week 2 game as part of the series. On July 29, 2020, all three games were cancelled due to the COVID-19 pandemic, as the ACC announced that it was restricting all teams to one non-conference game played in the team's home state only, and the SEC cancelled all non-conference play entirely.

Game results 

Rankings are from the AP Poll.

Future games

Records

By team

By conference

References

External links
 

College football kickoff games
College Kickoff
American football competitions in Atlanta
College sports in Georgia (U.S. state)
2008 establishments in Georgia (U.S. state)
Recurring sporting events established in 2008